Tapinoma panamense is a species of ant in the genus Tapinoma. Described by William Morton Wheeler in 1934, the species is endemic to Panama. These are known to be very small, at lengths of just 1-1.5 millimetres

References

Tapinoma
Hymenoptera of North America
Insects described in 1934